India has growing data centre industry. Data centers are used for national security, internet infrastructure, and economic output. As of 2022, India's data centre capacity is at 637 MW in 2022 which is expected to be 1318 MW by 2024. The data centre industry is valued at US$1.2 billion in 2021, a 216% growth from $385 million in 2014. The number of data centres in India is 138 as in March 2022. India ranks 13th globally in terms of highest number of data centres.

As of 2021, Indian data centers occupy over 8 million sq ft area. 60% of total data centres are in Mumbai, Chennai, Delhi and Bangalore.
India's data centre capacity is expected to double to 1318 MW by 2024 and 183 data centres by 2025.

Industry statistics
Data centers in India are used for information technology, submarine cable connectivity economic output, personal data protection legislation and investment incentives etc. As per JLL, Indian data centre industry is expected to add more 681 MW capacity by the end of 2024 leading to a doubling of existing capacity to 1,318 MW with 7.8 million sq ft of real estate space. Mumbai is expected to account for 57 percent of the new supply followed by Chennai at 25 percent. The 5g rollout also has enhanced the need of data centre capacity since it will increase data download speeds in India 10 times. Also Over-the-top media services in India, video streaming, online gaming, augmented reality and digital commerce are major factors of the developing industry.

Major data centre hubs

Mumbai
Mumbai holds the largest data centre market with a 44% alone. The total capacity is 289 MW, with having 3.6 million sq ft in its functional area. Big data centre giants like STT, CtrlS, Sify, Nxtra Data, Web Werks,
NTT etc. In 2020, REIT Equinix signed a deal to invest $161 million to feciliate a 19 MW local operations of GPX. Yotta Infrastructure, AdaniConneX venture had their major data centre projects in Mumbai.

Google has planned to set up a 8-storey 381,000 sq ft data centre in Navi Mumbai by 2025 with an investment of ₹1144 crore in first 10 years. Also Microsoft has plans to build a data centre in Mumbai. CtrlS Datacenters Ltd, which had 8 data centres (as of 2023) aims to have about 25 data centres by 2024–25 in India. It plans to expand 5 million sq ft after its existing 1.2 million sw ft, in which a 2 million sq ft hyperscale data centre is under construction in Navi Mumbai.

Bangalore
Bangalore, known as the Silicon Valley of India, has a major data centre presence due to its large IT infrastructure. As of 2020 Bangalore has a total capacity of 162 MW having 1.74 Million sq ft used for data centre. It possesses a 25% of the market share. ESDS, Sungard, Sify, Whitefield Nxtra Data, Evoque, STT, NTT etc. have their data centres here.

Noida (Delhi-NCR)
Noida, which falls under the Delhi-NCR has a significant data centre industry. It is the only data centre hub in North India. Delhi has a capacity of 72 MW and a total of 1.05 million sq ft with 11% market share.

Google has acquired a 464,000 sq ft facility at Adani Centre in Noida in 2022.

Chennai
Chennai has a major presence of data centre since it has the market with the second-highest number of undersea cables after Mumbai. Total capacity is 57 MW with 8% market share and a total of 0.92 million sq ft. Chennai is projected to overtake other markets to the second-largest up to 2030. Yotta, CtrlS, Princeton Digital, STT, and NxtGen have more than one campuses adding to local capacity.
The Adani enterprises has signed an MoU with the Tamil Nadu government to set up a data centre in Chennai, with an investment of Rs 2,500 crore.

Hyderabad
Due to its IT presence, Hyderabad consists the data centre industry with 6% market share, capacity of 38 MW and 0.71 million sq ft area. STT, Sify, and CtrlS are key players in the city.

Pune
Having IT industry in its main economy, Pune consists data centres with total capacity of 32 MW and 0.44 million sq ft with a 5% market share. National companies like Nxtra, STT, Web Werks Microsoft Azure have set up their campuses in Pune.

Kolkata
Kolkata is the only data centre hub in the East India region with total capacity of 5 MW and 0.07 million sq ft with a market share of 1%. Major players are Sify and STT. Sify has a data centre of 2 MW with 350 rack space.

Multiple data centre projects are under construction. As of 2021, Kolkata comes second in terms of land earmarked for data centres with 195 acres in its forey. Reliance Jio has acquired a 40-acre plot for a data centre. The Adani Enterprise has taken a 51.8 acre plot in the Silicon Valley Hub, New Town to build a hyperscale data centre with ₹10,000 crore investment.
Also Bharti Airtel Nxtra Data, has acquired plot to build a hyper-scale data centre of 25 MW (150,000 sq ft) in Kolkata with an investment of ₹600 crore, which is under construction as of 2022.
Hiranandani Group is also planning six data centres at Hind Motor, Uttarpara, West Bengal. The group acquired 100 plot at Uttarpara, Hooghly to setup six data centres (total 250MW) with an investment of 8,500 crore.

Major data centre companies

See also
Information technology in India

References

Data centers
Internet in India
Industry in India